The 2023 Jeux de la Francophonie, also known as IXieme Jeux de la Francophonie (French for 9th Francophone Games), informally Kinshasa 2023,  is scheduled to take place in 2023 in Kinshasa, Democratic Republic of the Congo.

Organisation

First selection
Moncton and Dieppe, New Brunswick, Canada were awarded the games in April 2016 over bids from Sherbrooke, Quebec and Guadeloupe. However, on 30 January 2019, the New Brunswick government cancelled its commitment to host the games due to funding issues. Up to 4,000 athletes and artists were expected to participate. Venues for the games were to include Universite de Moncton's Moncton Stadium, and facilities at Mount Allison University and Crandall University. New Brunswick Community College in Dieppe was expected to host the event's cultural activities.

Second selection
The city council of Sherbrooke, Quebec passed a motion in February 2019 expressing support for hosting the game provided the city receive financial support from the federal government of Canada and the provincial government of Quebec.

The Organisation internationale de la Francophonie issued a new call on 1 March 2019 for bids to host the games with a deadline of 31 May 2019 for submissions. The games were awarded to Kinshasha, Democratic Republic of Congo in July 2019.

In 2020, the games were moved from 2021 to 2022 to avoid clashing with the delayed 2020 Summer Olympics. They were postponed once again in 2022, to 2023.

Participants
Full members, associate members and observer members of the Organisation internationale de la Francophonie are eligible to participate in these games. As of August 2022, 42 out of 88 eligible countries and governments have confirmed their intention to participate in these games:

Venues
Stade des Martyrs de la Pentecôte - ceremonies, athletics
Palais du Peuple - song and dance events

Events

Sports
  Athletics 
  Basketball 
  Cycling (road) 
  Football (soccer) 
  Para-athletics 
  Judo 
  Table tennis 
   Wrestling (African and freestyle)

Cultural
Creative dance
Digital creation
Hip-hop dance
Juggling
Literature
Poetry
Painting
Photography
Puppetry
Sculpture
Song
Storytelling
Traditional inspiration dance

References

External links
Official site 

Jeux De La Francophonie, 2022
Jeux de la Francophonie
International sports competitions hosted by the Democratic Republic of the Congo
Sport in Kinshasa
Jeux de la Francophonie